Guessouma Fofana (born 17 December 1992) is a professional footballer who plays as a midfielder for  club Nîmes. Born in France, he represents Mauritania at international level.

Club career
In August 2018, Fofana joined En Avant de Guingamp on a three-year contract. The transfer fee paid to Amiens was estimated at €1 million. At the end of the summer 2019 transfer window, he moved on loan to Le Mans, newly promoted to Ligue 2.

International career
Fofana was called for the Mauritania national team in November 2021 in an 2022 FIFA World Cup qualification against Zambia and Equatorial Guinea. He debuted with Mauritania in a 1–1 tie with Equatorial Guinea on 16 November 2021.

International stats

Personal life
Born in France, Fofana is of Mauritanian and Malian descent. He is the brother of the footballers Gueïda and Mamadou Fofana.

Honours
Guingamp
Coupe de la Ligue: runner-up 2018–19

CFR Cluj
Liga I: 2021–22

References

1992 births
Living people
Footballers from Le Havre
Association football midfielders
Citizens of Mauritania through descent
Mauritanian footballers
Mauritania international footballers
French footballers
Mauritanian people of Malian descent
Sportspeople of Malian descent
French sportspeople of Mauritanian descent
French sportspeople of Malian descent
Le Havre AC players
US Boulogne players
Lyon La Duchère players
Amiens SC players
En Avant Guingamp players
Le Mans FC players
CFR Cluj players
Ligue 1 players
Ligue 2 players
Nîmes Olympique players
Championnat National players
Championnat National 2 players
Championnat National 3 players
Liga I players
Liga III players
Mauritanian expatriate footballers
French expatriate footballers
Mauritanian expatriate sportspeople in Romania
French expatriate sportspeople in Romania
Expatriate footballers in Romania
2021 Africa Cup of Nations players